Petaluma City Schools is a school district in Petaluma composed of the Petaluma Joint Union High District and the Petaluma City Elementary district. Petaluma City School has a total of 7,493 students enrolled as of 2016 with 2,379 students enrolled in Petaluma City Elementary district and 5,397 students enrolled in Petaluma Joint Union High District. Eight other elementary school districts, Cinnabar, Dunham, Laguna Joint, Liberty, Old Adobe, Two Rock Union, Waugh, Wilmar Union, feed into the high school district.

Secondary schools

High schools 
 Casa Grande High School
 Petaluma High School

Alternative schools 
 Carpe Diem High School
Crossroads Community Day School
 San Antonio High School
 Sonoma Mountain High School
Valley Oaks

Junior high schools 
 Kenilworth Junior High School
 Petaluma Junior High School

Elementary schools

Elementary schools 
 Grant Elementary School
 McDowell Elementary School
 McKinley Elementary School
 McNear Elementary School
 Valley Vista Elementary School

Charter schools 
 6th Grade Academy
 Mary Collins School at Cherry Valley
 Penngrove Elementary School
 Petaluma Accelerated Charter Academy

References

External links 
 

School districts in California
School districts in Sonoma County, California